Antsiferovo is a rural locality (a village) in Spasskoye Rural Settlement, Vologodsky District, Vologda Oblast, Russia. The population was 1 as of 2002.

Geography 
The distance to Vologda is 17 km, to Nepotyagovo is 7 km. Yaminovo, Zakryshkino, Rogozkino are the nearest rural localities.

References 

Rural localities in Vologodsky District